Sekolah Menengah Kebangsaan Kepong Baru, or more commonly abbreviated as SMKKB or SMKB, is a public coeducational secondary school located in the middle of the housing estate Kepong Baru in Kepong, Kuala Lumpur.

History 
SMKB was established in the year 1969. When it was first established, the first batch of students had to use the facilities of a nearby school, SRK Batu 4, Jalan Ipoh. In the meantime, the construction of the school was in progress on an  land in the heart of Kepong Baru. The students during that time were actually under the supervision of Allahyarham Khalid Murshid, the principal of SMK Raja Abdullah. There were 341 students being enrolled for the first time and the number grew drastically over the years. Up until now, the number of students is at least 3000.

School Architecture
There are 6 blocks of classrooms, various chemistry, biology, and multidisciplinary labs, 2 staff offices (1 for morning session, another for afternoon session), a front office, technical skills labs, a large library, multimedia conference rooms, a computer lab with 2 levels, and a general meeting room.
The school also has other recreational facilities such as the canteen, football field, basketball courts, hockey field, tennis court, fruit gardens and a multi-purpose badminton hall.

Extra-curriculum

Special Bodies

Prefectorial Board
Members of the board are required to have confidence and leadership skills. This dedicated group of people dress in uniforms with blue tops, dark blue skirts for the girls, white trousers for the boys, a tie, white socks and black shoes. Their sole purpose is to monitor the school's discipline and help discipline teacher to ensure the discipline of the school is kept under control. This board is the first and most important special unit in the school and they are divided into two sections which are the morning session prefects and afternoon session prefects. The morning session prefects are led by the leaders of the board which consist of form five prefects and they are easily identified as they are the only group of prefects which puts on a blazer while carrying out their duties. The board is then followed by form four junior prefects who wear a long sleeve blue shirt, and then the form one until form three prefects who wear a short sleeve blue shirts. There are many positions in this board, but they are only given to suitable and appropriate form 5 seniors chosen by the dedicated teachers. Some of the units of this board are- PA, Discipline, HEM, and zones.

Library Board 
Members are required to dress in uniforms with green tops and dark green bottoms. This board has two sections, namely the Librarians section and the Media section. Members in the Librarian section are in charge of the school library administration, while those who are in the Media section are in charge of the various PA system usage, most commonly during school assembly every day and every function and ceremony during school hours. The main teacher for this board in Mrs Juliyana.

Class Monitor Council 
Members are the aggregate class monitors from all classes of Form 3 to Form 5 in the school. The current teacher adviser is Pn Bavani a/p Sheivadasan.

Pre-U Council

Road Safety Board 
The Road safety Board, more commonly known as KJR (Keselamatan Jalan Raya) is a board that monitors the traffic in and around the school, preventing any accidents or incidents as such. Members are required to dress in uniforms with yellow tops and dark green bottoms. This board is the first Road Safety Board in the state of Kuala Lumpur. Mostly harmless, there are few functions and positive contributions related to this particular board as it helps to secure the traffic in the school and also prevents accidents between teachers in their vehicle and students who are walking.

Textbook Loan and Scheme Unit (SPBT) 

The Ministry of Education has implemented several important assistance programs, including the Textbook Loan Scheme or also known as Skim Pinjaman Buku Teks (SPBT).  In 1975, this program was launched for all government schools and government aided schools.  In 1983, this program was expanded to all State Government Religious Secondary Schools and People's Religious Secondary Schools registered with the State Islamic Religious Council / Department / Foundation. The goal of SPBT is to ensure that students from parents or guardians who are less able receive SPBT textbooks in the first week of the school session. SPBT is in charge of implementing the textbook loan scheme for all primary schools, secondary schools, and Public Religious Secondary Schools. The most important thing is to control the use of textbooks. Members are required to dress in uniforms with purple tops and dark blue bottoms.

Extra-curricular Unit

SMKKB Limited Corporation

Briged Bestari  
Members are required to wear a brown vest with the briged bestari logo on the back. Briged bestari helps with the technical side of things and some members are part of the publicity team for the school. Their duties include taking care of the computer lab, helping teacher or students with technicalities issue with the computers, post the latest info about the school on the school website and Facebook. Briged members built the current website and occasionally tasked with video editing for special events.

Combi  
This special body that consists of a very few amount of selected members. Their job is to prevent aedes mosquito infestation in school.

Uniformed Bodies 
 Scouts
 School Band
 St. John Ambulance
 St. John Ambulance (Pre-U)
 Young Cadets (KRS)
 Fire and Rescue Cadet Team
 Taekwondo Club
 Wudo Team
 Wushu Team
 Wushu Team (Pre-U)
Police cadet

Clubs and Societies 
 Malay Language Society
 English Society
 Chinese Language Society
 Tamil Language Society
 Islamic Society
 Buddhist Society
 Christian Fellowship
 Debating and Public Speaking Society
 Volley Ball Club
 Science and Mathematics Society
 History Society
 Geography Club
 Art Society
 Life Skills and Design Club
 Consumers and Finance Club
 Computer Club
 Environmentalist and Landscaping Club
 School Furniture Maintenance
 Reading Club
 Culture and Tourism Club
 LEO Club
 Crime Prevention Club
 Textbook Loan Scheme Unit (SPBT)
 School Choir Team (Unity of Voices)
 Chamber of Music
 Documentation and Photography Club
 Oratory and Debate Society
 Peer Counseling (PRS)
 Loyalty and Rukun Negara Club
 Chinese Orchestra Club
 Doktor Muda
 Road Safety Club
 Corporation Club

Sports & Games

Sports Houses 
 Blue House (Rumah Kasawari)
 Green House (Rumah Geroda)
 Red House (Rumah Rajawali)
 Yellow House (Rumah Kenyalang)
 Orange House (Rumah Nuri)
 Purple House (Rumah Jentayu)

**Orange and purple houses started in 2012 to encourage more involvement of students.

Clubs 
There are many sports clubs set up in SMKB, among these are:
 School Sports Council
 Sports Prefect Squad
 Volley Ball Club
 Athletics Club
 Football Club
 Basketball Club
 Netball Club
 Volleyball Club
 Badminton Club
 Badminton Club (Pre-U)
 Tennis Club (Pre-U)
 Table tennis Club
 Hockey Club
 Diabolo Club
 Chess Club (Pre-U)

Sports Facilities 
SMKB has been known for the many recent years of sports. This is mainly because of SMKB being one of the few schools in Kuala Lumpur that are equipped with sports facilities. For example, SMKB has a 300m track field, a futsal court, a basketball court, 4 badminton courts and a hockey pitch.

**Owing to the few tennis players, the tennis court has since transformed into a futsal court.

Secondary schools in Kuala Lumpur
Educational institutions established in 1977
1977 establishments in Malaysia
Schools in Kuala Lumpur